Burning Love and Hits from His Movies, Volume 2 is a compilation album by American singer and musician Elvis Presley. The album was released on November 1, 1972, on the budget label, RCA Camden. The contents of the album consist primarily of soundtrack recordings from various Presley films of the 1960s, augmented by both sides of his 1972 hit single, "Burning Love". Presley's recordings were generally issued by RCA on the standard Victor label, and not the budget Camden label; a similar compilation album, Separate Ways, was issued a month later, which also featured a recent chart hit leading a collection of older, non-hit soundtrack recordings. 

Upon its release, the album reached number 22 on the Billboard pop album chart and number 10 on the Billboard country chart. In the mid-1970s, RCA Records leased the rights to reissue certain RCA Camden recordings by Presley and other RCA recording artists to the budget reissue label Pickwick Records. Burning Love was reissued with the same cover art on the Pickwick label. After Presley's unexpected death in August, 1977, his recordings were in great demand and RCA sought to reclaim the rights to their Pickwick/Camden recordings, and reissued and repackaged several of them. Burning Love  was first reissued on compact disc on the RCA Camden label in 1987. The album was certified Gold on March 27, 1992, Platinum on July 15, 1999, and 2× Platinum on January 6, 2004, by the RIAA.
RCA reissued the album on CD again in 2006 as part of a reissue series featuring most of Presley's RCA Camden albums.

Track listing

Personnel
 Elvis Presley	— guitar, lead vocals
 The Jordanaires — background vocals except "Burning Love" and "It's A Matter of Time"
 Scotty Moore — guitar
 D.J. Fontana — drums, percussion
 Buddy Harman — drums, percussion
 Bob Moore — double bass
 Tiny Timbrell – guitar or mandolin on "Tonight Is So Right For Love"
 Hank Garland – guitar on "No More"
 Tommy Tedesco – lead guitar
 J.D. Sumner & the Stamps — background vocals on "Burning Love" and "It's A Matter of Time"
 James Burton — lead guitar on "Burning Love" and "It's A Matter of Time"
 Dennis Linde — lead/rhythm guitar on "Burning Love"
 Emory Gordy Jr. — bass guitar on "Burning Love" and "It's A Matter of Time"
 Glen D. Hardin — piano on "Burning Love" and "It's A Matter of Time"
 Ron Tutt — drums on "Burning Love" and "It's A Matter of Time"

References

Works cited
Elvis Sings Hits from His Movies, Volume 1 - Sergent.com.au

External links
CAS-2595 Burning Love and Hits from His Movies, Volume 2 Guide part of The Elvis Presley Record Research Database

Elvis Presley compilation albums
1972 greatest hits albums
Soundtrack compilation albums
RCA Records compilation albums
RCA Camden compilation albums